Aakia is a monotypic genus of grass in the family Poaceae. It is found in Central America and contains only the species Aakia tuerckheimii. It was described by J.R. Grande in Phytoneuron in 2014.

External links
Image of specimen at the University of Michigan Herbarium

References

Monotypic Poaceae genera
Panicoideae